William Poynton (born 30 June 1943) is an English former professional footballer who played in the Football League for Lincoln City and Mansfield Town.

References

1944 births
Living people
English footballers
Association football defenders
English Football League players
Burnley F.C. players
Mansfield Town F.C. players
Oldham Athletic A.F.C. players
Lincoln City F.C. players
Ashington A.F.C. players
People from Shiremoor
Footballers from Tyne and Wear